This is a recap of the 1975 season for the Professional Bowlers Association (PBA) Tour.  It was the tour's 17th season, and consisted of 34 events. Earl Anthony became the first PBA player to win seven titles in a season since Dick Weber (1961), while also gaining an unprecedented "three-peat" in the Brunswick PBA National Championship.  As he did in 1974, Anthony easily won the player vote for the PBA Player of the Year award. In another historic "first," Anthony earned $107,585 in 1975 to become the first bowler to collect over $100,000 in a single season.

Steve Neff made his second PBA Tour win count, capturing the BPAA U.S. Open, while Dave Davis collected his second career Firestone Tournament of Champions trophy.

Don Johnson won his 24th career PBA Tour title in the Tucson Open, which at the time tied him with Dick Weber for the most Tour wins. (Weber, however, had also won four BPAA All-Star events earlier in his career.  These were not counted as PBA titles at the time, but were added as titles in 2008 when the PBA amended its rules.)

Tournament schedule

References

External links
1975 Season Schedule

Professional Bowlers Association seasons
1975 in bowling